Jaime Eduardo Riveros Valenzuela (born 27 November 1970) is a Chilean former professional footballer who played as an attacking midfielder.

Club career

Background
He began his career in 1992 at Rancagua side O'Higgins, near Quinta de Tilcoco, town where Riveros born. In his first full season was loaned to Deportes Santa Cruz on a season long deal. After impressing at second-tier club, he returned to O'Higgins the next season and break into Manuel Pellegrini starting lineup in 1993.

In 1995, he joined Cobreloa, where played the Copa CONMEBOL in his first season, having a well performance because played all four games of his team for the contest, and scored two goals in the two leg matches against Ciclista Lima, first scoring his side's goal in the 1–4 away loss at Lima, for then score during the 7–2 thrash at Calama. However his team was eliminated by Rosario Central in the next key for a 5–1 aggregate loss. During that season, Riveros and Cobreloa reached the Copa Chile final too, losing it on hands of Universidad Católica.

At Loa River based-side, Riveros earned 175 and scored 74 times, being Cobreloa's playmaker for more than five years.

After their long spell with the Zorros del Desierto, in 2001, he moved to Santiago Wanderers, where helped the team to reach Primera División honour (league title) under Jorge Garcés as coach (who was manager of Riveros in Cobreloa during 1995), achieving of that form a title that Wanderers had failed to win since 1968. However, the same season was named the league most valuable player. In his last season at Valparaiso side, Riveros reached a record scoring 21 goals in 15 consecutive weeks during the 2004 Torneo Apertura.

In January 2005, Riveros joined Chilean powerhouse Universidad de Chile, where he had a short spell, playing the Copa Libertadores and netting two goals in 16 league games. After a regular performance with Los Azules, on mid-year he moved to Colombian side Deportivo Cali, where he won the Torneo Finalización.

After being released by Cali team, in 2006, Riveros re–joined his former club Santiago Wanderers.  Then, on mid-year he moved to Huachipato managed by Arturo Salah, who permanently used him as the starting lineup's playmaker. In December 2007, he failed to renew his contract and was released.

Everton
In 2008, he joined Everton and helped the team to win Torneo Apertura, being a key player during the campaign.

Retirement
In November 2011 he played his last professional match with CD Palestino against Unión San Felipe.

Managerial career
In 2014, Riveros became Deportes Santa Cruz coach.

International career
He has played for seven different clubs and has been called up to the national team.  He made his national team debut on 4 January 1997, against Armenia.  He represented his country at the Copa América 1997 playing in two games.

He also played three games for Chile in 1998 FIFA World Cup qualification, and other three in the 2002 FIFA World Cup qualifying, where scored a free kick goal against Colombia in a 3–1 away loss.

Career statistics

International goals
Scores and results list Chile's goal tally first, score column indicates score after each Riveros goal.

Honours

Club
Santiago Wanderers
 Primera División de Chile: 2001

Deportivo Cali
 Torneo Finalización: 2005

Everton
 Primera División de Chile: 2008 Apertura

Individual
 Chilean Footballer of the Year: 2001
 Record of regular phase consecutive weeks scoring 21 goals in 15 games: 2004
 Santiago Wanderers history's best signing according to El Mercurio de Valparaíso: 2004
 "El Gráfico" Ideal Team: 2008
 Santiago Wanderers Bicentennial Ideal Team: 2010

External links
 Riveros at Football Lineups

References

1970 births
Living people
Chilean footballers
Association football midfielders
Chile international footballers
Chilean Primera División players
Categoría Primera A players
Cobreloa footballers
C.D. Huachipato footballers
Deportes Santa Cruz footballers
Santiago Wanderers footballers
O'Higgins F.C. footballers
Universidad de Chile footballers
Unión Temuco footballers
Club Deportivo Palestino footballers
Deportivo Cali footballers
Everton de Viña del Mar footballers
Chilean expatriate footballers
Chilean expatriate sportspeople in Colombia
Expatriate footballers in Colombia
People from Cachapoal Province